The Douglas Bay Horse Tramway on the Isle of Man runs along the seafront promenade for approximately , from the southern terminus at the Victoria Pier, adjacent to the Isle of Man Sea Terminal, to Derby Castle station, the southern terminus of the Manx Electric Railway, where the workshops and sheds are located. It is a distinctive tourist attraction. However works have been underway to relay all of the track in 2019 and at present only a third (from the Derby Castle) is usable, with no published completion date for the works.

History
The tramway was built and initially operated by Thomas Lightfoot, a retired civil engineer from Sheffield. His service was introduced in 1876 between the bottom of what is now Summer Hill and the bottom of Broadway in the centre of today's promenade adjacent to the Villa Marina. In the earliest days the track was expanded, and passing loops and long crossovers added so that by 1891 the line ran double track the entire length of the promenade, much as it does today. From opening it has operated every year, except for a period during the Second World War.

In 1882, Lightfoot sold the line to Isle of Man Tramways Ltd, later the Isle of Man Tramways & Electric Power Co. Ltd, which also owned the Manx Electric Railway. The company went into liquidation in 1900 as a consequence of a banking collapse. The tramway was sold by the liquidator to Douglas Corporation in 1902. Since 1927 the tramway has run in summer only.

In 2015 Douglas Corporation partnered with Isle of Man Transport to introduce the 'Ticketer' system as used across the Island's other public transport systems. On board a Ticketer hand-held unit connects with the island-wide contactless Go Cards and individual tickets can also be purchased.

Closure
In January 2016, Douglas Corporation announced that the tramway had run for the last time the previous September and that they had closed it as it was not financially viable. The tramway had made a loss of £263,000 in 2015.

Continuance
After an online petition attracted more than 2,000 signatures, the House of Keys established a committee to look into ways of retaining the iconic horse trams. The operation of the tramway was taken over by the Isle of Man Heritage Railways division of the Department of Infrastructure and continued in the 2016, 2017 and 2018 summer seasons. However, there are plans to reduce part of the route from double to single track as part of the redevelopment of Douglas Promenade.

Description
The tramway is  narrow gauge, double track throughout, running down the middle of the road. Service is provided by 23 tramcars and some 45 horses. There have been several types of tramcar, and at least one of each type has been retained. Most services are maintained by "closed toastracks", with winter saloons and open toastracks also in semi-regular service. In summer, trams are stabled outdoors overnight adjacent to the Terminus Tavern public house, and there is a purpose-built tramshed where they are stored in winter. In 2014 it was announced by the Department of Infrastructure that during 2015 the horse trams would be temporarily suspended while resurfacing work on the promenade continued into its next phase, which runs from Regent Street to Strathallan. However, the plans were later revised, allowing regular horse tram operation to take place in 2015, 2016 and 2017.

Tramcars

Fleet
The remaining core of service trams represent a cross-section of various types of car used on the line over the years; notable exceptions from the current fleet are an umbrella car (one of which survives as a souvenir shop elsewhere) and a convertible car, although one of these survives in private ownership. This was the last of three cars from 1935 which were dubbed "tomato boxes" owing to their unconventional appearance. On 27 August 2016, after Douglas council took ownership, six trams were sold at auction, numbers 28, 33, 34, 37, 39 and 40.

Scrapped Fleet
The tramway amassed at total of 50 cars, the final three arriving as late as 1935. Over the years several of these became surplus to requirements and were scrapped; many were stored in the former cable car depot at York Road, Douglas prior to its demolition to make way for a residential complex in 1990, others were dismantled being surplus to requirements over the years. Nos. 48 and 50 were purchased for possible use as wayside shelters on the Manx Electric Railway and were stored for a time at Derby Castle; the plan however never came to fruition and both vehicles were scrapped in 1982 leaving No.49 as the sole remaining example of this type of tramcar. No.46 was relocated to Nobles Park in Douglas in 1988 where it saw use as a shelter (memorably it carried a black and neon colour scheme latterly, promoting the Palace Lido); it was removed from the island and fully restored for museum display though later scrapped despite having been heavily reconditioned.

Other tramcars
In addition to those cars remaining in the operational fleet, a number have survived and remained at other locations on the island; No. 14 spent several years at the Clapham Transport Museum until its closure, returning to the island in time for the centenary of the tramway in 1976; it entered the Manx Museum in 1991 where it remains today. No. 22 was converted into a souvenir shop used at Strathallan Crescent, it now resides at a transport museum in the north of the island where it fulfils the same role.

Future
Despite being the world's last remaining 19th century original horse-drawn passenger tramway and the second-oldest operational rail system on the island, the future of the tramway has been brought into question in recent years. Various plans were submitted by the island's Department of Infrastructure to rebuild the Douglas Promenades. In one version, the tramway would move from its current location in the middle of the roadway to a new single line formation adjacent to the Promenade walkway. The new plans have come in for some criticism from a large group of local residents who object to the siting of the trams near to the walkway. However, in 2019, the tracks were relaid in their previous alignment along the center of the road.  Trams started running again on Friday 29 July 2022, between Strathallan tram depot and Broadway. The service is scheduled to continue until 30 October.

See also

Transport on the Isle of Man
Victor Harbor Horse Drawn Tram, a horse-drawn tramway in Australia
List of light-rail/tram systems
List of town tramway systems in Europe

References

Notes

Bibliography

Hendry, Robert (1993). Rails in the Isle of Man: A Colour Celebration, Midland Publishing Limited, 
Pearson, Keith (1999). Douglas Horse Tramway - A Millennium Year History, 1st Edition, Adam Gordon, 
Johnston, Norman. "Douglas Horse Trams in Colour." Omagh: Colourpoint Press, 1995. .

External links
Douglas Borough Council - tramway page
Isle of Man Horse Drawn Trams
The Douglas Bay Horse Tramway (archived 13 Dec 2003)
Tram Travels: Douglas Bay Horse Tramway
Friends of Douglas Bay Horse Tramway (archived 2 Aug 2021)

3 ft gauge railways in the Isle of Man
Douglas, Isle of Man
Heritage railways in the Isle of Man
Heritage streetcar systems
Horse-drawn railways
Horse-drawn trams in operation
Railway lines opened in 1876
Tram transport in the Isle of Man
Tramways with double-decker trams
1876 establishments in the Isle of Man